Cowper-Thompson House, also known as the William Cowper House and Reverend Thompson House, is a historic home located at Murfreesboro, Hertford County, North Carolina.  It was built about 1790, and is a -story, five bay, transitional Georgian / Federal style frame dwelling with a center-hall plan.  It is sheathed in weatherboard and is connected to the original kitchen dependency by a new kitchen addition.  The house was restored in 1978–1980.

It was listed on the National Register of Historic Places in 1992.

References

Houses on the National Register of Historic Places in North Carolina
Georgian architecture in North Carolina
Federal architecture in North Carolina
Houses completed in 1790
Houses in Hertford County, North Carolina
National Register of Historic Places in Hertford County, North Carolina
Buildings and structures in Murfreesboro, North Carolina